Elections to Angus Council were held on 3 May 2012 the same day as the other Scottish local government elections. The election used the eight wards, created as a result of the Local Governance (Scotland) Act 2004, with each ward electing three or four councillors using the single transferable vote system form of proportional representation, with 29 Councillors being elected.

The 2007 election saw the Scottish National Party lose majority control on the council. In their stead the Angus Alliance took over the leadership of the council made up of all parties and groupings opposed to the SNP. Two independent councillors (one elected in 2007, the other elected at a by-election in 2011) remained outside the Angus Alliance.

The 2012 election saw the SNP gain two additional seats and regain their overall majority on the council. Independents also increased their overall numbers and became the second largest grouping while all other parties; the Scottish Conservative and Unionist Party, Labour and the Scottish Liberal Democrats lost seats. The Conservative and Unionist Party are the second largest political party represented on the council.

Following the election the Scottish National Party formed the administration on the council. Cllr Ian Gaul (Kirriemuir and Dean) was appointed leader of the council at the subsequent statutory meeting, Cllr Paul Valentine (Montrose) Depute Leader. Cllr Helen Oswald (Carnoustie and District) was elected Provost.

Election result

Note: "Votes" are the first preference votes. The net gain/loss and percentage changes relate to the result of the previous Scottish local elections on 3 May 2007. This may differ from other published sources showing gain/loss relative to seats held at dissolution of Scotland's councils.

Ward results

Kirriemuir and Dean
2007: 1xCon; 1xSNP; 1xLib Dem
2012: 2xSNP; 1xCon
2007-2012 Change: SNP gain one seat from Lib Dem

Brechin and Edzell
2007: 2xIndependent; 1xSNP
2012: 2xSNP; 1xIndependent
2007-2012 Change: SNP gain one seat from Independent

Forfar and District
2007: 2xSNP; 1xIndependent; 1xCon
2012: 2xSNP; 2xIndependent
2007-2012 Change: Independent gain one seat from Con

Monifieth and Sidlaw
2007: 2xSNP; 1xCon; 1xLab
2012: 2xSNP; 1xCon; 1xLab
2007-2012 Change: No change

Carnoustie and District
2007: 2xSNP; 1xLab
2012: 2xIndependent; 1xSNP
2007-2012 Change: Independent gain two seats from SNP and Lab

Arbroath West and Letham
2007: 1xCon; 1xSNP; 1xIndependent; 1xLib Dem
2012: 2xSNP; 1xCon; 1xIndependent
2007-2012 Change: SNP gain one seat from Lib Dem

Arbroath East and Lunan
2007: 2xSNP; 1xIndependent; 1xCon
2012: 2xSNP; 1xIndependent; 1xCon
2007-2012 Change: No change

Montrose and District
2007: 2xSNP; 1xIndependent; 1xLib Dem
2012: 2xSNP; 1xIndependent; 1xLib Dem
2007-2012 Change: No change

Changes since 2012 election
† On 26 February 2013, Ewan Smith, councillor for Arbroath West and Letham, resigned from the Scottish National Party to sit as an independent, following a dispute over schooling in Arbroath. Angus councillor Ewan Smith resigns from the SNP over schools His resignation caused the SNP to lose their majority on the council, however their administration continued.
†† On 8 September 2016, Bob Spink resigned for health reasons.'Voice of reason' Bob Spink stands down from Angus Council Spink was an independent councillor for Arbroath East and Lunan. A by-election was held on 28 November 2016 and was won by Brenda Durno for the SNP. As a result, the SNP briefly regained their majority on the council, but it was lost after another by-election a week later.
††† On 13 October 2016, Helen Oswald died from cancer.  Oswald was the Scottish National Party councillor for Carnoustie and District and the incumbent provost. A by-election was held on 5 December 2016 and was won by independent candidate David Cheape.

By-elections Since 2012

References

2012 Scottish local elections
2012